Peter Dubovský, SJ, (28 June 1921 in Rakovice – 10 April 2008 in Ivanka pri Dunaji) was a Slovak Auxiliary Bishop of the Roman Catholic Diocese of Banská Bystrica from 1991 until his retirement in 1997. Dubovský was ordained as a Catholic priest on December 24, 1950 and clandestinely as bishop on May 18, 1961 by Dominik Kalata, because of the Communist Government of Czechoslovakia and the persecution of the Roman Catholic Church by the government. He died on April 10, 2008, at the age of 86.

See also

References

1921 births
2008 deaths
20th-century Roman Catholic bishops in Slovakia
People from Banská Bystrica
Roman Catholic bishops in Czechoslovakia
People from Piešťany District